Elections to Rochdale Council were held on 4 May 2000.  One third of the council was up for election and the Labour Party kept overall control of the council.

After the election, the composition of the council was:
Labour 31
Liberal Democrat 21
Conservative 8

Election result

External links
BBC report of 2000 Rochdale election result

2000 English local elections
2000
2000s in Greater Manchester